The Catacaoan languages are an extinct family of three languages spoken in the Piura Region of Peru.  The three languages in the family are:

Catacao or Katakao, once spoken around the city of Catacaos
Colán or Kolán, once spoken between the Piura River and Chira River
Chira or Lachira or  Tangarará, once spoken along the Chira River. It is unattested.

In Glottolog, the two attested languages, Catacao and Colán, are subsumed into the extinct Tallán language as dialects.

Vocabulary comparison

Genetic relations
Loukota compares Catacaoan to the Culle language and the Sechura language but does not make any claims about genetic relatedness.

References

 
Indigenous languages of South America
Languages of Peru
Language families